The Nene derby is the name of the association football local rivalry in England between Northampton Town and Peterborough United, both of which are based along the River Nene. Fans of both clubs consider the other to be one of their main rivals. The first competitive match between the two clubs took place in 1946 but the first professional derby took place in 1960. As of 16 April 2021, there has been 74 competitive matches between the two teams, with 34 wins for Peterborough, 21 wins for Northampton and 19 draws.

The derby has never been played higher than the third tier of English football with 56 league matches, 7 FA Cup matches, 5 League Cup matches and 6 EFL Trophy matches. The most recent game took place in League One and resulted in a 3–1 win for Peterborough.

Northampton play their home games at Sixfields Stadium, while Peterborough play at London Road Stadium.

History

Early matches 
The first competitive game between the two clubs took place in the second round of the 1946-47 FA Cup. The match took place at Peterborough's London Road Stadium and ended in a 1–1 draw, forcing a reply. The reply ended in another 1-1, forcing a second reply which Northampton won 8–1. This victory still stands as the largest victory in the Nene derby.

Peterborough United won the Midland League five times in a row between 1956 and 1960 before being accepted into the Football League ahead of the 1960–61 season. That season, the Nene derby was played in the league for the first time with the first game ending in a 3–3 draw and the return fixture ending in a 0–3 win for Peterborough. Both teams were promoted to the Third Division as Peterborough won the league and Northampton finished third. Both teams played in the Third Division for the next two seasons before Northampton were promoted as champions in 1963.

The two teams did not play each other in the league again until the 1967-68 Third Division season after Northampton's run in the second and first tier.

1980s 
Peterborough were relegated into the Fourth Division ahead of the 1979–80 season. Both teams played in the Fourth Division for eight consecutive seasons until Northampton were promoted as champions in the 1986–87 season. The derby was also played twice in the FA Cup and twice in the League Cup during this period, bringing the total to twenty matches in eight years. The biggest victory over this period was a 6–0 home victory for Peterborough on 24 April 1984. Northampton recorded a 0–5 away victory on 12 October 1985.

Recent years 
Northampton's last win in the series came in a League Two match in 2006 when they won 0–1 at London Road, with Northampton's goal being scored by Scott McGleish who had played for Peterborough ten years earlier. Of the nine derbies since, Peterborough have won seven and two have ended in draw.

In the 2019–20 season, Peterborough finished seventh in League One whilst Northampton won the League Two play-offs, meaning that the Nene derby is returned for the 2020-21 League One season. Following Northampton's promotion, Peterborough United chairman, Darragh MacAnthony congratulated them and referred to the derby as "The one real 'local' rivalry I've experienced in 15 years at Posh." The first derby of the season was played two days after the death of Tommy Robson, Peterborough's record appearance maker who started his career with Northampton, and was played behind closed doors due to COVID-19 restrictions. Peterborough won the match 0–2 with goals scored by Nathan Thompson and Reece Brown. The second league derby of the season was originally scheduled to take place on Saturday 17 April 2021, however, all English football matches on that day were rescheduled as a mark of respect for the funeral of Prince Philip.

Rivalry 
While the proximity of the clubs was the main root of the rivalry between Northampton Town and Peterborough United, other events have fueled the division. Most notable among these are the violent confrontations between fans, famously the "Battle of Abington Park" in April 1974 when approximately 500 fans clashed before, during and after a derby. An eyewitness was quoted as saying "It was like a battle scene from a film where everyone converged to carry out personal duels. I have never seen anything like it." Some of the evidence presented in the court case that followed included "Sticks with nails embedded in the end, part of a brick, broken bottles, a large beer can and a pint mug."

Aside from fan violence, animosity has arisen over transfers between the clubs with Northampton fans accusing Peterborough of poaching players. It has been said that "Northampton fans have never forgiven Peterborough for taking star strikers Tony Adcock and Bobby Barnes when the Cobblers were cash strapped." This, however, has not stopped players from crossing the divide. Gabriel Zakuani, for example, signed for Northampton in 2016 after making 252 appearances for Peterborough.

List of derbies

Statistics

As of 10 October 2020

Below are the overall statistics for games between Northampton Town and Peterborough United in official matches.

References

England football derbies
Northampton Town F.C.
Peterborough United F.C.